Stadion Gelora Bung Tomo is a multi-purpose stadium in Benowo, Surabaya, East Java, Indonesia. It is a part of the Surabaya Sports Center. The rest of the sports complex consists of an indoor stadium and a mosque. This stadium is used mostly for football matches. It replaced the older Gelora 10 November Stadium.The stadium is used for football matches and is a new base for Persebaya Surabaya. GBT can accommodate 40,000 spectators. The stadium is named after Bung Tomo, who is a National Hero of Indonesia. It will host matches of the 2023 FIFA U-20 World Cup.

History
Groundbreaking occurred on 1 January 2008. Construction cost was estimated at Rp100 billion. The arena was designed by Malay architects KLIA. Stadion Gelora Bung Tomo was officially opened by President Susilo Bambang Yudhoyono on 11 August 2010.

Usage

Major concerts and other shows
The stadium has hosted major concerts and shows by many famous artists and bands, spanning many different genres.

Renovations 
To accommodate the stadium facilities for the 2021 FIFA U-20 World Cup, renovations are being done to the stadium. Including the installation of the scoreboard in the north upper tribune, repainting and repairing the facade, and adding seats to the stadium to make it a suitable all-seater stadium. The seats are arranged in a mosaic based in a green color representing the home team colors of Persebaya.

The Bung Tomo ornament and the stadium sign is already installed outside the Gelora Bung Tomo and also the floodlights (2400 lux) in December 2020. The first test of the new floodlights was in December, the second test of the new floodlights was increased at the brightness of 3500 lux. Three training fields are now finished. The floodlights were tested after the installation and the brightness is 800 lux, the second test in March 2021 was now in 1200 lux.

Gallery

See also
Persebaya
 List of stadiums in Indonesia
 List of stadiums by capacity
 List of stadiums

References

External links
 Stadium information
 Stadium information

Persebaya Surabaya
Football venues in Surabaya
Athletics (track and field) venues in Surabaya
Multi-purpose stadiums in Surabaya
Sports venues completed in 2010
2010 establishments in Indonesia